Florin station is a side platformed Sacramento RT light rail station in Sacramento, California, United States. The station was opened on September 26, 2003, and is operated by the Sacramento Regional Transit District. It served by the Blue Line. The station is located north of Florin Road at Indian Lane, and serves the surrounding residential and commercial areas along Florin Road, the Department of Human Assistance, and Luther Burbank High School.

Platforms and tracks

Gallery

References 

Sacramento Regional Transit light rail stations
Railway stations in the United States opened in 2003